Gechingen is a town in the district of Calw in Baden-Württemberg in Germany.

History
Lordship over Gechingen was inherited by the County Palatine of Tübingen, who sold the town to Herrenalb Abbey in 1308 or 1309. That district was reformed in 1938 as Landkreis Calw, and Gechingen remained in its jurisdiction. Gechingen grew slowly in the years after World War II and not see significant urban growth until the 1960s.

Geography
The municipality (Gemeinde) of Gechingen is located at the western edge of the district of Calw, along its border with the district of Böblingen. Elevation above sea level in the municipal area ranges from a high of  Normalnull (NN) to a low of  NN.

A portion of the Federally protected  nature reserve is located in Gechingen's municipal area.

Politics
Gechingen has one borough (Ortsteil), Gechingen, and four villages: Berghöfe, Bergwald, Dachtgrubenhöfe, and Waldhof. Gechingen is a member of the Althengstett Municipal Association with the municipalities of Althengstett, Ostelsheim, and Simmozheim.

Coat of arms
Gechingen's coat of arms displays a lion, in red, standing on a blue, three-pointed hill and facing to the left with a blue crosier in its forepaws, upon a field of yellow. The lion upon the hill is taken from the arms of the Counts of Calw, while the crosier references Herrenalb Abbey. The Federal Ministry of the Interior awarded this coat of arms to Gechingen alongside a municipal flag on 18 July 1955.

Transportation
Gechingen is connected to Germany's network of roadways by its local Kreisstraßen, which connect to the Bundesautobahn 81 near Gärtringen, about  outside of Gechingen's municipal area.

References

Calw (district)
Württemberg